Roneeka Hodges (born July 19, 1982) is an American professional basketball coach for the New York Liberty of the WNBA (WNBA) and a former player. Born in New Orleans, Louisiana, she is the twin sister of former WNBA player Doneeka Hodges.

A 5'11" guard, Hodges played for three seasons with the Houston Comets, who selected her from the 2005 WNBA Draft in the second round, 15th overall.  After the Comets folded in the fall of 2008, the Lynx selected Hodges as the fourth pick in the dispersal draft for former Comets players.

On February 6, 2008, Hodges was selected by the Atlanta Dream in the expansion draft. She was then traded to the Seattle Storm with the fourth pick for Seattle's eighth pick and Iziane Castro Marques. She was signed a contract once again to the Houston Comets.

Through three seasons with the Comets, Hodges scored 382 points, collected 112 rebounds, 66 assists, 32 steals, and 4 blocks. In 2006, she scored a career high 247 points, with her career high of 21 coming against the Washington Mystics.

WNBA career statistics

Regular season

|-
| align="left" | 2005
| align="left" | Houston
| 26 || 0 || 7.2 || .277 || .192 || 1.000 || 0.7 || 0.3 || 0.1 || 0.0 || 0.1 || 1.3
|-
| align="left" | 2006
| align="left" | Houston
| 33 || 8 || 21.2 || .401 || .367 || .744 || 2.0 || 1.0 || 0.5 || 0.1 || 1.1 || 7.5
|-
| align="left" | 2007
| align="left" | Houston
| 29 || 4 || 11.4 || .279 || .299 || .909 || 1.0 || 0.9 || 0.4 || 0.0 || 0.7 || 3.5
|-
| align="left" | 2008
| align="left" | Houston
| 15 || 6 || 18.3 || .423 || .371 || 1.000 || 1.9 || 1.2 || 0.3 || 0.2 || 0.5 || 7.3
|-
| align="left" | 2009
| align="left" | Minnesota
| 33 || 27 || 27.3 || .417 || .398 || .909 || 3.0 || 1.9 || 0.5 || 0.5 || 1.1 || 9.9
|-
| align="left" | 2010
| align="left" | San Antonio
| 34 || 19 || 25.3 || .357 || .308 || .758 || 3.2 || 1.4 || 0.4 || 0.3 || 1.2 || 7.7 
|-
| align="left" | 2011
| align="left" | San Antonio
| 28 || 5 || 9.8 || .404 || .400 || 1.000 || 1.3 || 0.5 || 0.2 || 0.1 || 0.1 || 3.9
|-
| align="left" | 2012
| align="left" | Indiana
| 12 || 0 || 8.9 || .318 || .259 || .500 || 0.6 || 0.6 || 0.3 || 0.5 || 0.3 || 3.2
|-
| align="left" | 2012
| align="left" | Tulsa
| 20 || 16 || 25.5 || .420 || .376 || .773 || 2.7 || 1.9 || 0.8 || 0.2 || 1.7 || 10.2
|-
| align="left" | 2013
| align="left" | Tulsa
| 33 || 8 || 17.2 || .387 || .360 || .875 || 1.2 || 1.0 || 0.5 || 0.1 
|| 0.5 || 5.0
|-
| align="left" | 2014
| align="left" | Tulsa
| 34 || 34 || 21.2 || .346 || .259 || .793 || 1.8 || 1.4 || 0.5 || 0.1 || 0.6 || 5.3
|-
| align="left" | 2015
| align="left" | Atlanta
| 23 || 9 || 19.5 || .382 || .360 || .750 || 2.0 || 1.3 || 0.2 || 0.2 || 1.0 || 6.4
|-
| align="left" | Career
| align="left" | 11 years, 6 teams
| 320 || 136 || 18.4 || .379 || .344 || .803 || 1.8 || 1.1 || 0.4 || 0.2 || 0.8 || 6.0

Playoffs

|-
| align="left" | 2005
| align="left" | Houston
| 2 || 0 || 1.0 || .000 || .000 || .000 || 0.0 || 0.0 || 0.5 || 0.0 || 0.5 || 0.0
|-
| align="left" | 2006
| align="left" | Houston
| 2 || 0 || 17.5 || .294 || .250 || .500 || 1.5 || 0.5 || 0.0 || 0.0 || 0.0 || 7.0
|-
| align="left" | 2010
| align="left" | San Antonio
| 2 || 2 || 28.5 || .529 || .429 || .000 || 1.5 || 1.5 || 0.0 || 0.0 || 1.5 || 10.5
|-
| align="left" | 2011
| align="left" | San Antonio
| 1 || 0 || 5.0 || .500 || .500 || .000 || 0.0 || 2.0 || 0.0 || 0.0 || 0.0 || 3.0
|-
| align="left" | Career
| align="left" | 4 years, 2 teams
| 7 || 2 || 14.1 || .417 || .353 || .500 || 0.9 || 0.9 || 0.1 || 0.0 || 0.6 || 5.4

LSU and Florida State statistics

Source

References

External links
Player Profile
College Profile
Expansion draft/analysis

1982 births
Living people
American women's basketball players
Atlanta Dream players
Basketball players at the 2003 Pan American Games
Basketball players from New Orleans
Florida State Seminoles women's basketball players
Houston Comets players
Indiana Fever players
LSU Lady Tigers basketball players
Minnesota Lynx players
San Antonio Stars players
Seattle Storm players
Tulsa Shock players
Pan American Games silver medalists for the United States
Pan American Games medalists in basketball
Guards (basketball)
Medalists at the 2003 Pan American Games